Ruben Aganbegyan (born 1972 in Novosibirsk) is a Russian economist, the President of Micex.  Son of the famous Soviet economist Abel Aganbegyan.

He graduated from Moscow State Law Academy. In 1990-2000s he worked in PricewaterhouseCoopers, Clifford Chance, Credit Suisse First Boston and Troika Dialog. In 2009 he became the president of Renaissance Capital.

External links
Biography
Ruben Aganbegyan appointed President of the MICEX, The Financial, 2010-07-27

1972 births
Living people
20th-century Russian economists
21st-century Russian economists
Armenian economists
Russian chief executives
Armenian businesspeople
People from Novosibirsk
Businesspeople from Moscow
Chief executives in the finance industry
Currency traders
Kutafin Moscow State Law University alumni
Russian people of Armenian descent